Sambara sinuana is a moth in the family Tortricidae first described by Leif Aarvik in 2004. It is found in Tanzania.

References

Endemic fauna of Tanzania
Olethreutinae
Moths described in 2004